The 2020 Dallas Renegades season was the first season for the Dallas Renegades as a professional American football franchise. They played as charter members of the XFL, one of eight teams to compete in the league for the 2020 season. The Renegades played their home games at the Globe Life Park in Arlington and were led by head coach Bob Stoops.

Their inaugural season was cut short due to the COVID-19 pandemic and the XFL officially suspended operations for the remainder of the season on March 20, 2020.

Standings

Schedule
All times Central

Final roster

Staff

Season summary 
The Renegades lost their first game of the season at home against the St. Louis BattleHawks 15–9, with Philip Nelson replacing an injured Landry Jones at the starting QB position. Landry came back in week 2 to lead Dallas to their first win of the season against the Los Angeles Wildcats, winning 25–18. They also beat the Seattle Dragons next week on the road 24–12, but then dropping to 2-2 after losing at home 27–20 to the then undefeated Houston Roughnecks.  The Renegades suffered another loss in week 5, losing to the New York Guardians at home 30-12 before the season's premature end.  The Renegades were the only team in the 2020 XFL season to not win a single game at home.

Game summaries

Week 1: vs. St. Louis BattleHawks

The Renegades were the only home team to lose in week 1.

Week 2: at Los Angeles Wildcats

Week 3: at Seattle Dragons

Week 4: Houston Roughnecks

Week 5: New York Guardians

With the loss, the Renegades finished their season 2-3 (0-3 at home). The remainder of their games were canceled due to the COVID-19 pandemic.

References

Dallas Renegades
Dallas Renegades
Dallas